Patrick Guillemin (1950–2011) was a French actor.

External links
 

1950 births
2011 deaths
French male film actors
People from Neuilly-sur-Seine
French male voice actors
French male television actors
French National Academy of Dramatic Arts alumni